Costello syndrome, also called faciocutaneoskeletal syndrome or FCS syndrome, is a rare genetic disorder that affects many parts of the body. It is characterized by delayed development and intellectual disabilities, distinctive facial features, unusually flexible joints, and loose folds of extra skin, especially on the hands and feet. Heart abnormalities are common, including a very fast heartbeat (tachycardia), structural heart defects, and overgrowth of the heart muscle (hypertrophic cardiomyopathy). Infants with Costello syndrome may be large at birth, but grow more slowly than other children and have difficulty feeding. Later in life, people with this condition have relatively short stature and many have reduced levels of growth hormones.  It is a RASopathy.

Beginning in early childhood, people with specific mutations on the Costello syndrome gene variant have an increased risk of developing certain cancerous and noncancerous tumors. Small growths called papillomas are the most common noncancerous tumors seen with this condition. They usually develop around the nose and mouth. The most frequent cancerous tumor associated with Costello syndrome is a soft tissue tumor called a rhabdomyosarcoma. Other cancers also have been reported in children and adolescents with this disorder, including a tumor that arises in developing nerve cells (neuroblastoma) and a form of bladder cancer (transitional cell carcinoma).

Costello syndrome was discovered by Jack Costello, a New Zealand paediatrician, in 1977.  He is credited with first reporting the syndrome in the Australian Paediatric Journal, Volume 13, No.2 in 1977.

Signs and symptoms

Genetics
Costello syndrome is caused by any of at least five different mutations in the HRAS gene on chromosome 11. This gene provides instructions for making a protein, H-Ras, that helps control cell growth and division. Mutations that cause Costello syndrome lead to the production of an H-Ras protein that is permanently active. Instead of triggering cell growth in response to particular signals from outside the cell, the overactive protein directs cells to grow and divide constantly. This unchecked cell division may predispose those affected to the development of benign and malignant tumors. It remains unclear how mutations in HRAS cause other features of Costello syndrome, but many of the signs and symptoms may result from cell overgrowth and abnormal cell division.

HRAS is a proto-oncogene in which somatic mutations in healthy people can contribute to cancer.  Whereas children with Costello syndrome typically have a mutation in HRAS in every cell of their bodies, an otherwise healthy person with a tumor caused in part by HRAS mutation will only have mutant HRAS within the tumor. The test for the mutation in cancer tumors can also be used to test children for Costello syndrome.

Costello syndrome is inherited in an autosomal dominant manner, which means one copy of the altered gene is sufficient to cause the disorder. Almost all cases have resulted from new mutations, and occur in people with no history of the disorder in their family. This condition is rare; as of 20 April 2007, 200 to 300 cases have been reported worldwide.

Diagnosis
Costello Syndrome can be difficult for doctors to immediately clinically diagnose, as there are similar conditions that resemble this syndrome. A physician will start by assessing the child's height, the size of the head, and birth weight.

Full genome and Exome next generation DNA testing is the primary diagnostic tool for Costello Syndrome.

Treatments
At the 2005 American Society of Human Genetics meeting, Francis Collins gave a presentation about a treatment he devised for children affected by Progeria.  He discussed how farnesyltransferase inhibitors (FTIs) affects H-Ras. After his presentation, members of the Costello Syndrome Family Network discussed the possibility of FTIs helping children with Costello syndrome. Mark Kieran, who presented at the 1st International Costello Syndrome Research Symposium in 2007, agreed that FTIs might help children with Costello syndrome.  He discussed with Costello advocates what he had learned in establishing and running the Progeria clinical trial with an FTI, to help them consider next steps.

Another medication that affects H-Ras is Lovastatin, which is planned as a treatment for neurofibromatosis type I.  When this was reported in mainstream news, the Costello Syndrome Professional Advisory Board was asked about its use in Costello Syndrome. Research into the effects of Lovastatin was linked with Alcino Silva, who presented his findings at the 2007 symposium. Silva also believed that the medication he was studying could help children with Costello syndrome with cognition.

A third medication that might help children with Costello syndrome is a MEK inhibitor that helps inhibit the pathway closer to the cell nucleus.

Research

Spanish researchers reported the development of a Costello mouse, with the G12V mutation, in early 2008. Although the G12V mutation is rare among children with Costello syndrome, and the G12V mouse does not appear to develop tumors as expected, information about the mouse model's heart may be transferable to humans.

Italian and Japanese researchers published their development of a Costello zebrafish in late 2008, also with the G12V mutation. The advent of animal models may accelerate identification of treatment options.

Historical
That genetic mutations in HRAS cause Costello syndrome was first reported in 2005. These mutations, along with mutations that cause cardiofaciocutaneous syndrome, found soon after, surprised geneticists and changed how genetic syndromes can be grouped. Before this, geneticists looked for new mutations in genes with mutations that caused syndromes similar to the unknown syndrome. For example, researchers looked at and around the most common Noonan syndrome mutation, PTPN11, but did not find anything related to Costello syndrome or cardiofaciocutaneous syndrome. The first mutation that is now identified as one of the Costello syndrome alleles was found unexpectedly when Japanese researchers used the DNA of children with Costello syndrome as a control, looking for another Noonan gene

Geneticists realized that the syndromes they were grouping together clinically according to their signs and symptoms were related in a way they had never realized: the mutations that cause Costello syndrome, Noonan syndrome and cardiofaciocutaneous syndromes are linked by their cellular function, not by being on or close to a gene with a known mutation.  The cellular function that links them is a common signalling pathway that brings information from outside the cell to the nucleus.  This pathway is called the Ras-MAP-kinase signal transduction pathway (Ras-MAPK Pathway).

References

Some text in this article was originally taken from http://ghr.nlm.nih.gov/condition=costellosyndrome, a public domain source

External links 

 GeneReviews: Costello Syndrome
 GeneReviews: Daisy's battle with Costello Syndrome

Genodermatoses
RASopathies
Autosomal dominant disorders
Syndromes affecting the heart
Syndromes with craniofacial abnormalities
Rare syndromes